Kiya Husayn II, was the last ruler of the Afrasiyab dynasty, ruling from the late 15th-century till his death in 1504. He was the grandson and successor of Luhrasp.

Biography 

He ruled over a large part of western Mazandaran, and districts of Firuzkuh, Damavand, and Hari-rud. During the dissolution of the Aq Qoyunlu confederation, Kiya Husayn II expanded his rule from western into central Iran, where he captured Ray and Semman. He also defeated Mohammad Hosayn Mirza, who was the Timurid governor of Astarabad. It was probably around this period that Kiya Husayn II married the Aq Qoyunlu princess Tajlu Khanum.

He later became the enemy of the Safavid shah Ismail I (r. 1501-1524), whom he may have seen as a rival for the command over the Shi'ites in Iran. In 1504, Kiya Husayn II's territories was invaded by Ismail I, who seized the strongholds of Gol-e Khan and Firuzkuh, and surrounded Kiya Husayn II in Osta, who was shortly captured. However, the latter committed suicide—his body was burned at Isfahan in front its inhabitants, whilst his followers in Mazandaran were slaughtered. Ismail I took Tajlu Khanum into his harem, where she became his favorite wife.

References

Sources 
 
 

15th-century monarchs in the Middle East
16th-century monarchs in the Middle East
15th-century Iranian people
16th-century Iranian people
1504 deaths
15th-century births
Afrasiyab dynasty
Iranian slave owners